The Baćina lakes are located in Dalmatia, Croatia. The lakes are named after the inland town of Baćina close to the port city of Ploče. The lakes are part of a picturesque landscape and surrounded by mountains. They are situated between Makarska and Dubrovnik. It is a crypto-depression lake, with its bottom below the surface of the sea.

Description

Despite its proximity to the sea and the permeable nature of the karst area, they are fresh water lakes. The seven lakes cover an area of 138 hectares and they are named Oćuša, Crniševo, Podgora, Sladinac, Vrbnik, Šipak and Plitko.  Six of these lakes are linked. The only isolated lake is Vrbnik.The largest lake is Oćuša and the deepest is the Crniševo (34 m). The lakes are connected with the sea and at times the water can be brackish, also the surface of the lakes lies 80 cm above sea level. Salty water is found at the bottom of the deepest lake Crnisevo.

Lake Vrgorac located to the north of the Baćina lakes drains into the Adriatic Sea through them.

At the turn of the century  the Austro-Hungarian government built a tunnel to the sea. This led to the lowering of the lake level which has brought about biological changes. The tunnel currently runs underneath the Adriatic Highway.

In recent times the lake has become a well-known hunting ground for grey mullet (Mugil saliens).

See also

References

External links 

 www.bacina.com

Lake groups of Croatia
Landforms of Dubrovnik-Neretva County
LBaćina